Negromoon Creek is a stream in the U.S. state of Alaska. It is a tributary to the Inglutalik River.

Small quantities of gold have been found at Negromoon Creek.

See also
List of rivers of Alaska

References

Rivers of Alaska